Peter Lin is an American vascular surgeon, medical researcher, specializing in minimally invasive endovascular treatment of vascular disease. He has published extensively in the area of vascular surgery and endovascular surgery.

Lin is Professor Emeritus of Surgery at the Baylor College of Medicine in Houston, Texas, where he was a member of its surgical faculty from 2001 to 2015. He also served as the Chief of Vascular Surgery at the Michael E. DeBakey Veterans Affairs Medical Center in Houston from 2001 to 2007. In 2006, he became Chief of Vascular Surgery of the Department of Surgery at Baylor College of Medicine, holding that position until 2015 when he moved to Los Angeles.

Early life and education 
Lin was born in Taiwan, and he earned his undergraduate degree in biology from the University of California, Riverside in 1988. He graduated from the Rosalind Franklin University of Medicine and Science / Chicago Medical School in Chicago Illinois in 1992. He completed his general surgery residency at Mount Sinai Medical Center in Chicago, Illinois, and was concurrently a research assistant in the Vascular Surgery Research Lab at the Loyola Stritch School of Medicine in Maywood, Illinois. From 1998 to 2000, he completed a Vascular Surgery fellowship and an Endovascular Surgery fellowship at the Emory University School of Medicine in Atlanta, Georgia.

Medical career 
As a faculty member at Baylor, he carried out research in vascular surgery. His clinical interests primarily involve minimally invasive endovascular therapy of deep vein thrombosis, peripheral arterial disease, and pulmonary embolism. His clinical experience in endovascular intervention in part contributed to the clinical approval of treatment indication using thrombolytic therapy in acute pulmonary embolism.

As Chief of Vascular Surgery at the Veterans Affairs Medical Center in Houston, Lin developed its vascular program into a premier clinical service in the VA healthcare system. The success of this vascular surgery program with veterans led to the visit of President George H.W. Bush in 2003.

He served as a physician advisor to Congressman Gene Green who introduced Aneurysm Detection Bill in 2004 which provided Medicare coverage for Abdominal Aortic Aneurysm (AAA) screening and detection. The legislation became known as the Screening Abdominal Aortic Aneurysms Very Efficiently (SAAAVE) Act of 2004 (HR 4626).

Research interests and contributions 

Lin has published more than 400 scholarly articles in scientific journals. He serves on the editorial boards or as a reviewer for many scientific journals. He has authored more than 60 book chapters and edited 3 vascular textbooks. His writing and speaking have focused on a range of subjects including endovascular treatment of aortic aneurysms, venous disease, endovascular treatment of lower extremity occlusive disease, experimental models of endovascular therapy, and thrombolysis in arterial and venous thrombosis research.

Lin's research interest is in cellular dysfunction in arterial and venous thrombosis as well as experimental model of endovascular therapy. His research expertise also includes clinical outcome of endovascular interventions. He was the principal investigator on a five-year National Institute of Health grant to study hypertension and homocysteinemia in atherosclerotic lesion formation.

Honors and awards 

2001 - Allastair Karmody Award – Society for Clinical Vascular Surgery
2002 - American Venous Forum Research Award 
2008 - Baylor College of Medicine Michael E. DeBakey Distinguished Service Award

Publications
Partial list:

References

Living people
American vascular surgeons
American people of Taiwanese descent
Baylor College of Medicine physicians and researchers
Baylor College of Medicine faculty
Rosalind Franklin University of Medicine and Science alumni
Emory University faculty
University of California, Riverside alumni
Year of birth missing (living people)